Fengcheng is a county-level city in northern Jiangxi province, People's Republic of China, under the administration of Yichun, located along China National Highway 105 and on the eastern (right) bank of the Gan River about  south of Nanchang, the provincial capital. The literal translation of the name is "Abundance City", due to its importance as a major commercial hub for agricultural products. The 2005 GDP was more than 9.1 billion RMB.

In 210 AD, during the Eastern Han Dynasty, it was founded as Jianyi County.

Administrative divisions
In the present,Fengcheng City has 5 subdistricts, 20 towns and 7 townships. 
5 subdistricts

20 towns

7 townships

Notable people
Hu Xiaomei (Chinese: 胡晓梅), radio personality and former host of the show At Night You're Not Lonely (Chinese: 夜空不寂寞)

Climate

References

External links
 Fengcheng Web (Chinese) 

County-level divisions of Jiangxi
Cities in Jiangxi